Valentina Kevliyan (or Valentina Kevlian, ; born 11 March 1978 in Plovdiv) is a Bulgarian rhythmic gymnast.

At the 1996 Olympic Games, held in Atlanta, she won a silver medal as part of the Bulgarian rhythmic gymnastics group (along with teammates Ina Delcheva, Maria Koleva, Maya Tabakova, Ivelina Taleva and Viara Vatashka).

See also 
 Gymnastics at the 1996 Summer Olympics – Women's rhythmic group all-around

References

External links 
 Valentina Kevliyan at FIG
 
 

1978 births
Living people
Bulgarian rhythmic gymnasts
Gymnasts at the 1996 Summer Olympics
Olympic gymnasts of Bulgaria
Sportspeople from Plovdiv